Here Come the Yankees is the official fight song of the New York Yankees baseball team.

It has been the official team anthem since 1967, when it was composed by Bob Bundin and Lou Stallman. Bundin and Stallman were associated at the time with Columbia Records, whose then-owner, the media conglomerate CBS, was also the parent company of the Yankees. It was recorded by the Sid Bass Orchestra and Chorus. The instrumental version airs at the top of all Yankees radio broadcasts and was also used on Yankee telecasts until 1990 and when WCBS2 had the yankees in 2002 and 2003 seasons during the end broadcast.

References

External links
Full lyrics

Major League Baseball fight songs
New York Yankees
Songs written by Lou Stallman
1967 songs